Parcours de la Frontière is an 18-hole disc golf course located in Parc Régional St-Bernard in Saint-Bernard-de-Lacolle, Quebec,  from the United States border. It was designed by Peter Lizotte and Michel St-Pierre in 2014. The course regularly ranks among the highest-rated disc golf courses in Quebec.

Tournaments 
The 2019 Red Robin Open, part of the PDGA-sanctioned 2019 Tournée Pro-Am Disc Golf series was held at the Parcours de la Frontière

See also 
 List of disc golf courses in Quebec

References

External links 

 
 Official map
 Parcours de la Frontière on DG Course Review
 Parcours de la Frontière on the PDGA course directory
 Course walkthrough video

Disc golf courses in Quebec